Relations between Armenia and Germany, have always been stable and solid, with both countries continuing to work together and advance through the years in cooperation.  Both countries' leaders have discussed bilateral relations and noted that they have considerably improved over the last few years.

Diplomatic relations
Germany made steps to recognize the Armenian genocide in 2005, during the rule of the Socialist-Green coalition led by Chancellor Gerhard Schröder.  However, while calling on Turkey to accept its "historic responsibility", the German government declined to use the word "genocide". During the Cold War, the need to keep Turkey's support had caused NATO members such as West Germany to ignore the topic. In 2015, public discussion about the Armenian genocide and the explicit usage of the term "genocide" in official language has been renewed in Germany.

In March 2015, the German Federal Foreign Office reported positive political, economic and cultural relations between both countries.

Armenian soldiers have been attached to German contingents during their deployment in Afghanistan. The division was guarding the coalition airport in the northern city of Kunduz.

Resident diplomatic missions
 Armenia has an embassy in Berlin.
 Germany has an embassy in Yerevan.

See also
 Foreign relations of Armenia
 Foreign relations of Germany
 Armenians in Germany
 Armenia–European Union relations
 Armenian genocide recognition

References

External links
 Serge Sargsyan: Armenian-German relations have risen to a new level, Public Radio of Armenia, 22 June 2007 (archived link, 8 February 2012)
 Armenian President and German Ambassadress discuss the present level of Armenian-German relations (archived link, 8 February 2012)
 Germany is proud to be second, after U.S., donor-state for Armenia, PanARMENIAN.net, Heike Renate Peitsch, 25 June 2007

 
Germany
Bilateral relations of Germany